St Helens South was a borough constituency represented in the House of Commons of the Parliament of the United Kingdom. It elected one Member of Parliament (MP) by the first past the post system of election.

Boundaries
The Borough of St Helens wards of Eccleston, Grange Park, Marshalls Cross, Parr and Hardshaw, Queen's Park, Rainhill, Sutton and Bold, Thatto Heath, and West Sutton.

The constituency was one of two covering the Metropolitan Borough of St Helens, the other being St Helens North.  It contained the southern part of the borough including the town centre of St Helens, the south of the town, Clock Face and Rainhill.

Following recommendations made by the Boundary Commission for England, St Helens South was replaced with a new St Helens South and Whiston constituency, which includes three wards from Knowsley borough.

History
The forerunner seat had been represented by members of the Labour Party since 1935.

The constituency was formed in 1983, and was represented by Labour's Gerry Bermingham from then until he stood down in 2001.  He was replaced by Shaun Woodward, who had defected from the Conservatives to Labour in December 1999.  Woodward was deemed unlikely to retain his Witney constituency in Oxfordshire as a Labour candidate (it was subsequently won by David Cameron, former Leader of the Conservatives and Prime Minister of the United Kingdom), and was instead selected for this safe seat. Woodward had won all three elections however he lost his position in the cabinet because of the Labour party defeat to the Liberal Democrat-Conservative coalition government in the 2010 general election.

Members of Parliament

Elections

Elections in the 1980s

Elections in the 1990s

Elections in the 2000s

See also
 List of parliamentary constituencies in Merseyside

Notes and references 

Constituencies of the Parliament of the United Kingdom established in 1983
Constituencies of the Parliament of the United Kingdom disestablished in 2010
Politics of the Metropolitan Borough of St Helens
Parliamentary constituencies in North West England (historic)